The 2016 City of Bradford Metropolitan District Council election took place on 5 May 2016. This was on the same day as other local elections. One councillor was elected in each ward of the City of Bradford Metropolitan District, for a four-year term. Each ward is represented by three councillors, the election of which is staggered, so only one third of the councillors were elected in this election.

Election Result
Of the Council's 90 seats, 30 were up for election.

Ward results
An asterisk denotes an incumbent.

Baildon ward

Bingley ward

Bingley Rural ward

Bolton and Undercliffe ward

Bowling and Barkerend ward

Bradford Moor ward
The incumbent Faisal Khan was elected as a councillor for the Respect Party but resigned from the party in October 2013 and served as an independent councillor until March 2015 when he rejoined the party.

City ward
The incumbent Ruqayyah Collector was elected as a councillor for the Respect Party but resigned from the party in October 2013 and served as an independent councillor until March 2015 when he rejoined the party.

Clayton and Fairweather Green ward

Craven ward

Eccleshill ward

Great Horton ward

Heaton ward
The incumbent Mohammad Shabbir was elected as a councillor for the Respect Party but resigned from the party in October 2013 and served until April 2015 as an independent councillor, he then joined the Labour Party.

Idle and Thackley ward

Ilkley ward

Keighley Central ward

Keighley East ward

Keighley West ward

Little Horton ward
The incumbent Alyas Karmani was elected as a councillor for the Respect Party but resigned from the party in October 2013 and served as an independent councillor until March 2015 when he rejoined the party.

Manningham ward
The incumbent Ishtiaq Ahmed was elected as a councillor for the Respect Party but resigned from the party in October 2013 and served as an independent councillor until March 2015 when he rejoined the party.

Queensbury ward

Royds ward

Shipley ward

Thornton and Allerton ward

Toller ward

Tong ward

Wharfedale ward

Wibsey ward

Windhill and Wrose ward

Worth Valley ward

Wyke ward

By-elections between 2016 and 2018 elections

Queensbury ward
By-election triggered by the resignation of Cllr. Lisa Carmody (Conservative Party).

Wibsey ward
By-election triggered by the death in office of Cllr. Lynne Smith (Labour).

See also
 Bradford local elections

References

2016 English local elections
2016
2010s in West Yorkshire